Trichopsocus is a genus of lash-faced psocids in the family Trichopsocidae. There are about nine described species in Trichopsocus.

Species
These nine species belong to the genus Trichopsocus:
 Trichopsocus brincki Badonnel, 1963 c g
 Trichopsocus chilensis New & Thornton, 1981 c g
 Trichopsocus clarus (Banks, 1908) i c g b
 Trichopsocus coloratus Lienhard, 1983 c g
 Trichopsocus dalii (McLachlan, 1867) i c g b
 Trichopsocus difficilis Lienhard, 1996 c g
 Trichopsocus fastuosus (Navás, 1915) c g
 Trichopsocus maculosus Mockford, 1969 c g
 Trichopsocus marmoratus (Hagen, 1865) c g
Data sources: i = ITIS, c = Catalogue of Life, g = GBIF, b = Bugguide.net

References

Further reading

External links

 

Trichopsocidae